Hotel Geneve Mexico City is an historic hotel in Mexico City's Zona Rosa neighborhood, near Paseo de la Reforma, in Mexico. Established in 1907, the hotel's Phone Bar has a collection of antique phones, inspired by Winston Churchill's visit. The lobby features a small museum.

See also
 List of hotels in Mexico

References

External links
 
 

1907 establishments in Mexico
Cuauhtémoc, Mexico City
Hotel buildings completed in 1907
Hotels established in 1907
Hotels in Mexico City